Gailbach is a river of Moselle, France and Saarland, Germany. It flows into the Blies near Niedergailbach.

See also 
 List of rivers of Saarland
 List of rivers of France

References

Rivers of Moselle (department)
Rivers of Saarland
Rivers of France
Rivers of Germany
Rivers of Grand Est
International rivers of Europe